William Wirt may refer to:
William Wirt (Attorney General) (1772–1834), Attorney General of the United States
William Wirt (educator) (1874–1938), superintendent of Gary, Indiana, schools